The  character has number 39 in ASCII and code U+0027 in Unicode. It is used as:

Apostrophe (as straight version of the  character), a punctuation mark, and sometimes a diacritical mark

It is often used in informal contexts to replace other similar looking characters that include:

Accents, pronunciation, or stress

Diacritical marks
Acute accent , a diacritic used in many modern written languages
Geresh , a sign in Hebrew writing
Grave accent , a diacritical mark in many written languages
 Apex , a diacritic used to indicate a long vowel

Modifier letter punctuation
Modifier letter apostrophe , a glyph
Modifier letter left half ring , a character used to transliterate the letter ayin, representing the sound ʕ
Modifier letter right half ring

Other uses as accents, pronunciation, or stress
ʻOkina , a unicameral consonant letter
Spiritus lenis 
Stress (linguistics) , relative emphasis or prominence given to a certain syllable in a word
Ejective consonant , used in the International Phonetic Alphabet

Units of measure
Prime (symbol) , used to designate units and for other purposes in mathematics, the sciences, linguistics, and music
Foot (unit), a unit of length in the imperial and US customary systems of measurement
Minute, a unit of time
Minute of arc, a unit of arc

See also
Apostrophe (disambiguation)
Comma, a punctuation mark that appears in several variants in different languages